The office of the Governor of Yap is the highest elected position in the state of Yap, Federated States of Micronesia. 

History of the office holders are as follows

Elections 
Yap holds an election for its legislature, Governor, and Lieutenant Governor every four years. The most recent election was held on Tuesday, November 6, 2018. Of the Governor and Lieutenant Governor, one of them must be born in the outer islands and one must be born from the main island of Yap.

References

Yap
1979 establishments in the Trust Territory of the Pacific Islands